Stop the Sun, I Want to Go Home is the fourth album by folk rock band Tiny Lights, released in 1992 through Doctor Dream Records.

Release and reception 

Nitsuh Abebe of Allmusic, who had lauded the band's previous work, did not appreciate the stylistic change of Stop the Sun, I Want to Go Home. He gave it two and a half out of five stars, concluding that while the music did not compare with the band's early catalog, the album contained enough flair to keep it interesting. On the other hand, critics of the Trouser Press felt it was band's greatest accomplishment and that cited "Better" as the high point of the album and the band's career.

Track listing

Personnel 

Tiny Lights
 Donna Croughn – vocals, violin, illustrations
 Andy Demos – drums, clarinet, saxophone
 Dave Dreiwitz – bass guitar, trumpet, vocals
 Stuart Hake – cello
 John Hamilton – guitar, piano, vocals, production

Additional musicians and production
 Max Bowers – recording
 Kevin Croughn – illustrations
 Eric O’Brien Garten – recording

References 

1992 albums
Tiny Lights albums